The Outdoor Life Conservation Pledge was established in 1946 and then revised in 1993. The pledge was written  to remind readers of Outdoor Life magazine and other sportsmen of the vigilance needed to preserve the natural world. The pledge has been taken by thousands of people including Harry S. Truman and Al Gore, and it runs on the letters page of every issue of Outdoor Life.

The current pledge reads:

Along with the pledge, two awards are given annually by the magazine to honor an individual in the private sector and one in the public sector. The Outdoor Life Conservation Award was first presented in 1923 to those who "accomplish the greatest good for the sportsmen's cause in the United States," said founder J. A. McGuire. Ordinary people and celebrities have both received the award. Probably the most famous recipient is Jimmy Carter.

The original pledge was:

That pledge was chosen in a 1946 contest with western novelist  L.L. Foreman receiving $3000 dollars for the winning entry. The second place prize of $1000 went to biologist Rachel Carson who would years later write Silent Spring.

References
 

1943 establishments in the United States
Environmental sayings